Fools and Riches is a 1923 American drama film directed by Herbert Blaché and written by Charles Kenyon and George C. Hull. The film stars Herbert Rawlinson, Katherine Perry, Tully Marshall, Doris Pawn, Arthur Stuart Hull, and Nick De Ruiz. The film was released on May 7, 1923, by Universal Pictures.

Cast          
Herbert Rawlinson as Jimmy Dorgan
Katherine Perry as Nellie Blye
Tully Marshall as John Dorgan
Doris Pawn as Bernice Lorraine
Arthur Stuart Hull as Dick McCann 
Nick De Ruiz as Frasconi 
Roy Laidlaw as Lawyer
John Cossar as President of the Railroad

References

External links

1923 films
1920s English-language films
Silent American drama films
1923 drama films
Universal Pictures films
Films directed by Herbert Blaché
American silent feature films
American black-and-white films
1920s American films